The UAB Blazers are the varsity intercollegiate athletic programs that represent the University of Alabama at Birmingham (UAB). The school is one of the eleven member institutions of Conference USA (C-USA) and participates in Division I of the NCAA. The school's men's basketball team plays in 8,508-seat Bartow Arena. The Blazers' colors are forest green and old gold. The men's basketball program has a long history of success spanning several decades.

On October 21, 2021, UAB was one of six C-USA members announced as incoming members of the American Athletic Conference on July 1st, 2023.

Sports sponsored

A member of Conference USA (C-USA), the University of Alabama at Birmingham sponsors teams in six men's and twelve women's NCAA sanctioned sports. Bowling competes in the Mid-Eastern Athletic Conference and rifle in the Southern Conference. Beach volleyball had played in the Coastal Collegiate Sports Association before C-USA started sponsoring the sport in 2021–22.

2014–15 school year
UAB's president announced on December 2, 2014, that the school's football, bowling, and rifle teams would be terminated for economic reasons. However, the school announced on June 1, 2015, that pledges of additional revenue had been made, allowing the terminated programs to be reinstated. Bowling and rifle were reinstated immediately. The intent was for the football program to return for the 2016–2017 school year, although due to massive transfers from the program and the NCAA's recruiting rules, the program would be rebuilt largely with junior college transfers and would return in 2017. With the termination of the football program, UAB had announced the addition men's cross country in order to remain in the NCAA's Division I, but with the return of football, the sport was then dropped.

On June 4, Conference USA announced it would not take any action against UAB now that it has reinstated football, and the school would remain in the conference. The conference stated, "At its fall meeting, the Board expects UAB to submit for review a comprehensive plan addressing the key elements of UAB's football program going forward. No additional action from the Board is expected until that time."

Basketball

Men's basketball 

The UAB Blazers, in effect, started their entire athletics program with the creation of a men's basketball team in 1978.  Setting the standards high from the start, UAB hired former UCLA, University of Illinois and Memphis head coach Gene Bartow. Known to many as the "Father of UAB athletics", Bartow led the Blazers to almost instant success. In 2004, the school once again gained national attention when it upset No. 1-seeded Kentucky in the second round of the tournament and advanced to the Sweet Sixteen. Since their inaugural season, the Blazers have made 15 appearances in the NCAA men's basketball tournament including 3 Sweet Sixteen appearances and 1 Elite Eight appearance. UAB has also appeared in the NIT a total of 11 times, including 2 appearances in the NIT Final Four.

After only 34 years of basketball, UAB has had 31 winning seasons including memorable wins over Virginia, Kentucky, Louisville, Alabama, Florida, Villanova, Indiana, and Memphis, among others. The Blazers have amassed one of the best all-time winning percentages in college basketball. The UAB men's basketball team has been ranked in the Associated Press Top 25 Poll many times in school history and as recently as 2010. UAB has been ranked as high as #9 in the nation. UAB's most recent conference championship occurred in the 2021-2022 season when they won the CUSA conference tournament championship. Until 1988, UAB played its home games at the Birmingham–Jefferson Convention Complex. Since then, UAB has played its home basketball games in Bartow Arena where the Blazers have won more than 80 percent of its games.

Women's basketball 

Though largely overshadowed by the men's basketball program at UAB, the Blazers women have a strong history in their own right. Since UAB began a women's basketball program, UAB has won 4 conference championships, made 2 NCAA Tournament appearances, and 5 WNIT appearances as recently as 2013. No team in Conference USA has advanced further than the Blazers' Sweet Sixteen appearance in the NCAA tournament of the 1999–2000 season. The Blazers have also advanced to the Elite Eight of the WNIT. UAB won the WBI championship in 2011.

Football 

UAB began its football program in the early 1990s. Jim Hilyer was the first head coach of the Blazers, coaching from 1991 to 1994.
Beginning with the first NCAA sanctioned Division III football team in 1991, UAB joined Division I-AA in 1993 and moved to Division I-A in 1996, joining Conference USA in 1999.

Coach Watson Brown took over as head coach in 1995 and held the position through the end of the 2006 season, when he left for Tennessee Tech. Neil Callaway was named head coach after a deal with Jimbo Fisher collapsed. After five seasons, Callaway was dismissed, and Garrick McGee was hired from the University of Arkansas after Callaway was released. He held the post for two years before leaving to accept the offensive coordinator job at the University of Louisville, replaced by Bill Clark.

In 2000, UAB achieved a monumental victory by beating LSU in Baton Rouge. In 2004, UAB reached its first ever bowl game, falling 59–40 in the Hawaii Bowl to Hawaii. In 2011, an effort to build an on-campus stadium failed to gain approval by the University of Alabama board of trustees; this served as a harbinger of the program's eventual termination following the 2014 season. UAB announced on June 1, 2015, that their football program will be re-instated. UAB was granted permission by the NCAA to rejoin NCAA Division I FBS level football and would be bowl-eligible when they officially returned to the field in fall 2017. The Blazers responded with the program's best regular-season record ever at 8–4. They would lose the Bahamas Bowl to Ohio.

In 2018 the Blazers overachieved, completing their best season to date by finishing the year with a school record of 11–3 and a dominating win (37–13) over Northern Illinois in the 2018 Boca Raton Bowl. This marked UAB's first bowl game win in school history.

The Blazers moved into the new Protective Stadium on the grounds of the Birmingham–Jefferson Convention Complex in 2021.

Soccer

Men's soccer 

UAB began a men's soccer program back in 1979. Throughout its history, UAB has enjoyed great success in the men's soccer program.  The men's team has been in the NCAA Tournament a total of 7 times including 2 Sweet Sixteen appearances and 1 Elite Eight appearance in 1999. The men's team has been ranked nationally numerous times throughout its history, including top 25 rankings in 16 of the last 18 seasons.  One of UAB's biggest wins in the men's team history came when UAB upset the #1-ranked UCLA Bruins in 1997 by a score of 2–0. UAB would upset another #1-ranked team in 2006 when they beat the SMU Mustangs by a score of 2–1.

The men's team plays their home games at UAB's West Campus Field. Since 1993, the men's team has won nearly 80% of its games played at West Campus Field.  UAB has frequently been among the national leaders in soccer attendance, finishing as high as 16th nationally in average attendance. The highest attended home soccer game in UAB history came in 2011 when 3,141 fans saw the Blazers defeat Clemson 2–1.

Although many traditions, cheers, and chants take place at each home game, there is one that "stands above the rest," according to current head coach Mike Getman. Led by alumni super-fan Andrew Robillard, who has not missed a UAB men's home soccer match in 22 seasons, the whole student section sings "God Bless America" in unity. The Hillsborough Times has reported this tradition as one of its "12 College Sports Traditions you Don't Want to Miss."

UAB has played at the 2,500-seat BBVA Compass Field since 2015.

Women's soccer 
Though only beginning a women's soccer program only in 1996, the UAB women's soccer team has already been in the NCAA Tournament and has also been ranked several times in its history.  The UAB women's soccer team has won the Conference USA Championship 3 times in ten years, including the most recent in 2006. Erica Demers has been the UAB women’s soccer head coach since May 2017. The women's team has played at PNC Field (formerly BBVA Field) since 2015.

Men's tennis 
Derek Tarr, former-professional South African tennis player, took the helm of the men's tennis team in 1989. Since then, Tarr has led the men's tennis team to numerous top finishes in the Conference USA, including a handful of trips to the NCAA Men's Tennis Tournament. Since 1989, the men's team has accumulated a winning percentage just shy of seventy percent. The UAB men's tennis team has produced numerous player who have gone on to the ATP World Tour. In the 2015–2016 season, the team was ranked as high as #74 by the ITA. The team currently practices at UAB's four-court facility located on campus and plays home matches at the Lakeshore Foundation Tennis Center located in Homewood, Alabama.

Men's golf 
Frequently ranked among the nation's better collegiate programs including as high as #8 in 2011, the men's golf program has gained considerable recognition.  Over the program's history, UAB has made 7 appearances in the NCAA Men's Golf Championship tournament including 6 times in the last 10 years.  The UAB golf team has won 2 conference titles including the 2008 Conference USA Championship.  Several UAB golfers have gone on to have success as professional golfers including 2010 U.S. Open champion Graeme McDowell and Garrett Osborn.  McDowell won the Haskins Award during his senior season in 2002. UAB's golf team is led by coach Mike Wilson.

Softball 
The UAB Softball program played its first season in 2000. The program played its home games at George Ward Park from inception through the 2009 season. In 2010, the Blazer Softball team began playing home games at an on campus stadium. The stadium was built after parents of softball players filed a Title IX complaint against the university. In 2016, the stadium was named Mary Bowers Field in recognition of gifts given by Mary and Keith A. Bowers. Marla Townsend was named the first head coach in 1998 and the team began play in 2000. She was head coach for 18 years until the 2016–17 season. She had a record of 532–507 at UAB. Amanda Ellis served as interim head coach for the 2017–18 season and compiled a 26–32–1 record. On June 16, 2018, Jimmy Kolaitis was named the programs 3rd head coach, 2nd permanent, in program history. The Blazers have made the NCAA Tournament 5 times (2010, 2011, 2012, 2013, and 2014). The Blazers advanced to the Super Regionals in 2013 by winning the Louisville Regional. UAB lost to #2 overall seed Florida Gators in the Super Regionals 4–3 and 1–0 to barely miss advancing to the College Softball World Series. The Blazers finished the 2013 Season nationally ranked, #16 in the USA Today/NFCA poll and #17 in the ESPN.com/USA Softball Poll. UAB has one Conference regular season Championship in program history (2013). Overall, UAB has a record of 558–539–1.

Synchronized swimming 
The UAB synchronized swimming team was formed in the 1998–99 season and quickly established themselves as dominant in the sport having finished numerous times among the Top 5 teams in the nation. The team has since been dropped as a varsity sport from UAB

Championships
Conference Championships (9)
 Football (2):  2 – Conference USA
 Men's Basketball (5)  3 – Sun Belt; 2 – Conference USA
 Women's Softball (1):  1 – Conference USA
 Men's Baseball (1):  1 — Conference USA
 Mixed Rifle (2): 2 — Southern Conference

Rivals
UAB's main rivals are conference opponent Southern Miss of Conference USA, and Troy of the Sun Belt Conference.

When both teams were members of Conference-USA, the UAB–Memphis football rivalry was called the Battle for the Bones (sometimes known as "The BBQ Bowl") and included both professional and amateur barbecue contests as part of the pregame festivities. The winner of the game received a traveling 100-pound bronze rack of ribs trophy, known as The Bones' trophy.

In men's basketball, UAB also has an in-state rivalry with Auburn where Auburn holds the current series advantage with 11 wins and 10 losses after winning 6 straight.  The rivalry was on hold for a number of years until it was again resumed in the 2015 season.

Mascots

The current UAB mascot is a green dragon named Blaze.  Former mascots included a strange cartoonish Nordic warrior named Blaze the Viking in 1993 and a rooster named Beauregard T. Rooster, which remained the school's mascot until 1992 when Coach Gene Bartow thought it would be a good time to change as UAB joined the Great Midwest Conference.

Blazers ISP Radio Network
UAB athletic events can be heard on the following stations:
 WUHT-FM 107.7 – Birmingham/Tuscaloosa/Gadsden/Anniston/Cullman
 WJOX-FM 94.5 – Birmingham/Tuscaloosa/Selma/Demopolis
 WPAS-FM 89.1 – Mobile/Biloxi/Pascagoula/Gulf Shores
 WGMP AM 1170 – Montgomery/Prattville/Selma/Greenville/Troy
 WTKI AM 1450 – Huntsville/Madison
 WIEZ AM 1490 – Decatur/Hartselle/Moulton|Athens
 WSGN FM 98.3 – Talladega/Ashland/Oxford/Alexander City
 WKLS FM 105.9 – Centre/Piedmont/Collinsville/Cedar Bluff
 WJOX AM 690 – Birmingham/Huntsville/Montgomery
 WACT AM 1420 – Tuscaloosa/Brent/Eutaw

References

External links